Olena Heorhiyivna Lys (born 15 June 1971) is a Ukrainian politician currently serving as a People's Deputy of Ukraine from Ukraine's 201st electoral district since 29 August 2019. She is a member of Servant of the People.

Early life and career 
In 1990, she graduated from Sokorosk Pedagogical School, and began teaching the same year. In 1997, she graduated from Chernivtsi University, majoring in elementary education and practical psychology. From 1996, she worked as a primary school teacher. Lys is married, and has one son and one daughter.

Political career 
Lys ran a successful campaign to become a People's Deputy of Ukraine from Ukraine's 201st electoral district in the 2019 Ukrainian parliamentary election as a member of Servant of the People. At the time of her election, she was an independent. According to analytical portal Slovo i Dilo, by February 2021 Lys had fulfilled 23% of her electoral promises, having promised to increase teacher salaries, create a national agency for qualifying education workers, improve the development of transportation in the city of Chernivtsi, and improve the city's sewage system.

References 

1971 births
Living people
Chernivtsi University alumni
Ninth convocation members of the Verkhovna Rada
Servant of the People (political party) politicians
Women members of the Verkhovna Rada